Operation Ichi-Go was a campaign of a series of major battles between the Imperial Japanese Army forces and the National Revolutionary Army of the Republic of China, fought from April to December 1944. It consisted of three separate battles in the Chinese provinces of Henan, Hunan and Guangxi.

These battles were the Japanese Operation Kogo or Battle of Central Henan, Operation Togo 1 or the Battle of Changheng, and Operation Togo 2 and Togo 3, or the Battle of Guilin-Liuzhou, respectively. The two primary goals of Ichi-go were to open a land route to French Indochina, and capture air bases in southeast China from which American bombers were attacking the Japanese homeland and shipping.

In Japanese the operation was also called Tairiku Datsū Sakusen, or "Continent Cross-Through Operation", while the Chinese refer to it as the Battle of Henan-Hunan-Guangxi.

Japanese plans
Operation Ichi-Go had multiple objectives: It attempted to link railways in Beijing and Hankou in northern China to the southern Chinese coast at Canton to spare shipping and avoid American submarines; to take the airfields in Sichuan and Guangxi to preclude U.S. bombing of Taiwan and the Japanese mainland; and to destroy elite Nationalist units to cause the Nationalist government to collapse.

Prelude

Starting in 1942, Nationalist China diverted troops to retake the province of Xinjiang from the Soviet client-state of Sheng Shicai, whose army was supported by the Soviet Red Army's 8th Regiment in Hami, Xinjiang. The Soviets became involved in the province during the Soviet invasion of Xinjiang in 1934, where the Soviets occupied northern Xinjiang. The Soviets obtained control over the rest of Xinjiang after the Islamic rebellion in Xinjiang in 1937, placing all the province under Sheng Shicai control. The fighting then escalated in early 1944 with the Ili Rebellion; the Soviet-backed Uyghur Communist rebels forced China to commit 120,000 troops in opposition to the rebellion. Compounding the previous difficulties, The Republic of China's Nationalist forces had become overconfident after a string of three victories in defense of Changsha; the Battle of Changsha (1939), the Battle of Changsha (1941), and the Battle of Changsha (1942).

Chiang Kai-shek and Republic of China authorities deliberately ignored a tip from the French military in Indochina of the impending Japanese offensive. The Chinese military believed the tip to be a result of Japanese disinformation, since only 30,000 Japanese soldiers were involved in the first manoeuvre of Operation Ichi-Go. Since the Japanese force only crossed the Yellow river in Northern China, the Chinese believed that it was a small scale offensive. Another major factor was that the battlefront between China and Japan had remained static since 1940, and Chiang Kai-shek believed Japan was reluctant to break the stalemate. In Northern China, Japan had been content to merely support the puppet government of Wang Jingwei and exploit resources in occupied territories.

The Japanese indeed acted this way for most of the 1940s, only making a few weak, failed attempts to capture China's provisional capital in Chongqing. Japan had previously exhibited no intention of linking the transcontinental  Beijing-Hankou and Canton (Guangzhou)-Hankou railways. In addition to its earlier victories in Changsha, China had also defeated Japan in the India-Burma theater with X Force and Y Force. China believed the Burma theater to be of far more strategic importance than Southern China, which contributed to their decision to ignore French intelligence.

China believed the initial Japanese attack in Ichi-Go to be a localized feint in northern China, so 400,000 troops in Northern China were deliberately withdrawn without a fight in the face of the Japanese advance. The initial force of 30,000 Japanese troops soon grew to number several hundred thousand, and the Chinese defensive line collapsed as the offensive pressed into Central and South China. However, a contingent of 17,000 Chinese held  Hengyang against over 110,000 Japanese soldiers in what would become the longest siege of the war. The siege resulted 19,000-60,000 deaths for the Japanese.

Until Operation Ichi-Go the Nationalist forces of the Republic of China had deployed 5 armies of the 8th war zone to contain the Communist Chinese forces instead of using them to fight Japan. But eventually dietary deficiencies of Japanese soldiers and increasing Japanese casualties forced Japan to end Operation Ichi-Go in Guizhou, causing the entire operation to cease. After the end of Operation Ichi-Go in 1945, Chiang Kai-shek implemented a plan to withdraw Chinese troops from the Burma theatre (where they had been fighting against the Japanese in Southeast Asia) for a counter offensive called "White Tower" and "Iceman" against Japanese soldiers in China.

Campaign

There were two phases to operation Ichi-Go. In the first phase, the Japanese secured the Pinghan Railway between Beijing and Wuhan; in the second, they displaced the US air forces stationed in Hunan province and reached the city of Liuzhou, near the border with Japanese-held Indochina. 17 divisions, including 500,000 men, 15,000 vehicles, 6,000 artillery pieces, 800 tanks and 100,000 horses participated in this operation.

The Japanese included Kwantung Army units and equipment from Manchukuo, mechanized units, units from the North China theater and units from mainland Japan to participate in this campaign. It was the largest land campaign organized by the Japanese during the entire Second Sino-Japanese War. Many of the newest American-trained Chinese units and supplies were forcibly locked in the Burmese theater under Joseph Stilwell set by terms of the Lend-Lease Agreement.

In Operation Kogo, 390,000 Chinese soldiers, led by General Tang Enbo, were deployed to defend the strategic position of Luoyang.  The 3rd Tank Division of the IJA crossed the Yellow River around Zhengzhou in late April and defeated Chinese forces near Xuchang, then swung around clockwise and besieged Luoyang. Luoyang was defended by three Chinese divisions. Japan's 3rd Tank Division began to attack Luoyang on May 13 and took it on May 25.

The second phase of Ichi-Go began in May, following the success of the first phase. Japanese forces advanced southward and occupied Changsha, Hengyang, Guilin and Liuzhou. At the Defense of Hengyang, the Japanese only won a Pyrrhic victory since 17,000 Chinese soldiers held out against over 110,000 Japanese soldiers from June 22–August 8, 1944, inflicting 19,000-60,000 dead on the Japanese. In December 1944, Japanese forces reached French Indochina and achieved the purpose of the operation. Nevertheless, there were few practical gains from this offensive. US air forces moved inland from the threatened bases near the coast. The operation also forced British Commandos working with the Chinese as part of Mission 204 to leave China and return to Burma. The U.S. Fourteenth Air Force often disrupted the Hunan–Guangxi Railway between Hengyang and Liuzhou that had been established in Operation Ichi-Go. Japan continued to attack airfields where US air forces were stationed up to the spring of 1945.

The XX Bomber Command operating Strategic B-29 bombers of the Twentieth Air Force, which were attacking Japan in Operation Matterhorn, were forced to move as well. Although this affected their efficiency for a short time, in early 1945 the Twentieth Air Force moved to newly established bases in the Marianas under the command of the newly established XXI Bomber Command. This nullified the limited protection from U.S. bombing that the Japanese home islands had received from Operation Ichi-Go.

Henan peasants attack Kuomintang forces
General Jiang Dingwen of the First War Zone gave this account of the behavior of Henan civilians: "During the campaign, the unexpected phenomenon was that the people of the mountains in western Henan attacked our troops, taking guns, bullets, and explosives, and even high-powered mortars and radio equipment... They surrounded our troops and killed our officers. We heard this pretty often. The heads of the villages and baojia (village mutual-responsibility groups) just ran away. At the same time, they took away our stored grain, leaving their houses and fields empty, which meant that our officers and soldiers had no food for many days." This was revenge for the 1938 Yellow River flood and the Chinese famine of 1942–43. General Jiang's account also said: "Actually this is truly painful for me to say: in the end the damages we suffered from the attacks by the people were more serious than the losses from battles with the enemy." The Henan peasants picked up the weapons Kuomintang troops had abandoned to defend themselves against the Japanese. Moreover, when the Kuomintang army ordered the Henan locals to destroy the local highways to prevent the Japanese advance, they refused. In fact they sometimes even went back at night and mended roads which the army had torn up by day.

Aftermath
With the rapid deterioration of the Chinese front, specifically the Nationalist forces, General Joseph Stilwell saw Operation Ichi-Go as an opportunity to win his political struggle against Chiang Kai-shek, China's leader, and gain full command of all Chinese armed forces. He was able to convince General George Marshall to have President Franklin D. Roosevelt send an ultimatum to Chiang threatening to end all American aid unless Chiang "at once" placed Stilwell "in unrestricted command of all your forces."

An exultant Stilwell immediately delivered this letter to Chiang despite pleas from Patrick Hurley, Roosevelt's special envoy in China, to delay delivering the message and work on a deal that would achieve Stilwell's aim in a manner more acceptable to Chiang. Seeing this act as a move toward the complete subjugation of China, a defiant Chiang gave a formal reply in which he said that Stilwell must be replaced immediately and he would welcome any other qualified U.S. general to fill Stilwell's position.
As a result, Stilwell was replaced as Chief of Staff to Chiang Kai-shek and commander of the U.S. Forces, China Theater (USFCT) by Major General Albert Wedemeyer. Stilwell's other command responsibilities in the China Burma India Theater were divided up and allocated to other officers.

Although Chiang was successful in removing Stilwell, the public relations damage suffered by his Chinese Nationalist Party (Kuomintang) regime was irreparable. Right before Stilwell's departure, New York Times drama critic-turned-war correspondent Brooks Atkinson interviewed him in Chungking and wrote:The decision to relieve General Stilwell represents the political triumph of a moribund, anti-democratic regime that is more concerned with maintaining its political supremacy than in driving the Japanese out of China.  The Chinese Communists... have good armies that they are claiming to be fighting guerrilla warfare against the Japanese in North China—actually they are covertly or even overtly building themselves up to fight Generalissimo's government forces... The Generalissimo [Chiang Kai-shek] naturally regards these armies as the chief threat to the country and his supremacy... has seen no need to make sincere attempt to arrange at least a truce with them for the duration of the war... No diplomatic genius could have overcome the Generalissimo's basic unwillingness to risk his armies in battle with the Japanese.

Atkinson, who had visited Mao Zedong in the communist capital of Yenan, saw his Communist Chinese forces as a democratic movement (after Atkinson visited Mao, his article on his visit was titled Yenan: A Chinese Wonderland City), and the Nationalists in turn as hopelessly reactionary and corrupt. This view was shared by many U.S. journalists in China at the time, but due to pro-Chiang Allied press censorship, it was not as well known to their readers until Stilwell's recall and the ensuing anti-Chiang coverage forced it into the open.

The Japanese successes in Operation Ichi-Go had a limited effect on the war. The U.S. could still bomb the Japanese homeland from Saipan and other Pacific bases. In the territories seized, Japanese forces controlled only the cities, not their surrounding countryside. The increased size of the occupied territory also thinned out the Japanese lines. A great majority of the Chinese forces were able to retreat out of the area, and later come back to attack Japanese positions. As a result, future Japanese attempts to fight into Sichuan, such as in the Battle of West Hunan, ended in failure. All in all, Japan was not any closer in defeating China after this operation, and the constant defeats the Japanese suffered in the Pacific meant that Japan never got the time and resources needed to achieve final victory over China. The Japanese suffered 11,742 KIAs by mid-November, and the number of soldiers that died of illness was more than twice this. The total death toll was about 100,000 by the end of 1944.

Operation Ichi-Go created a great sense of social confusion in the areas of China that it affected. Chinese Communist guerrillas were able to exploit this confusion to gain influence and control of greater areas of the countryside in the aftermath of Ichi-Go. This along with the aforementioned rapid deterioration of the Nationalist forces, Nationalist unpopularity both internally and abroad, Communist popularity both internally and externally, Kuomintang corruption and other factors allowed the Communists to gain victory in the resumed Chinese Civil War after World War II. Historian Hans van de Ven argues that the impact Ichi-Go had on the political situation in China was as important to the post-war world order as Operation Overlord and Operation Bagration were in Europe.

In popular culture
The 1958 novel The Mountain Road, by Theodore White, a Time magazine correspondent in China at the time of the offensive, was based on an interview with former OSS Major Frank Gleason, who led a demolition group of American soldiers during the offensive that were charged with blowing up anything left behind in the retreat that might be of use to Japan. His group ultimately destroyed over 150 bridges and 50,000 tons of munitions, helping slow the Japanese advance. In 1960, it was adapted into a film by the same name starring James Stewart and Lisa Lu, noteworthy for being one of Stewart's few war films and the only one in which he plays a soldier, as he opposed war films because of their inaccuracy. It is generally believed he made an exception for this film because it was antiwar.

References

Bibliography
 Mitter, Rana, China's War with Japan, 1937-1945: The Struggle for Survival, Penguin Books (2014),

Further reading
 
 

Ichi-Go
1944 in China
1944 in Japan
Military history of Henan
Military history of Hunan
Military history of Guangxi
Ichi-Go